Plant for Pakistan (Plant4Pakistan), also known as 10 Billion Tree Tsunami, is a five-year project to plant 10 billion trees across Pakistan from 2018 to 2023. Prime Minister Imran Khan started the drive on 2 September 2018 with approximately 1.5 million trees planted on the first day. The campaign was based on the successful Billion Tree Tsunami campaign of the former Pakistan Tehreek-e-Insaf government, also led by Imran Khan, in the province of Khyber Pakhtunkhwa in 2014. This different initiative is often confused with the initiative of the Prime Minister Mian Muhammad Nawaz Sharif who launched a national campaign of Green Pakistan and also allocated budget funding from the PSDP.  

In 2020, the program tripled its number of workers to 63,600 after being momentarily halted following the coronavirus pandemic, aiming to enlist those left unemployed by its economic consequences. Most of the work, which pays between 500-800 rupees (US$3-5) a day, takes place in rural areas, with people setting up nurseries, planting saplings, and serving as forest protection guards. The plan was awarded 7.5 billion rupees ($46m) in funding.
Saplings planted during the initiative included mulberry, acacia, moringa and other indigenous species.

Planting Billions of Trees 
While Pakistan's economy is 135th in terms of greenhouse gas emissions, it is among the top ten countries in the world to be affected by global warming according to the annual report of Global Climate Risk Index of German Watch, which ranks Pakistan as eighth among the countries most at risk of climate change. As of November 2021, Lahore is the number one in the world in terms of air pollution. Major cities have experienced major heat waves and high levels of pollution into the 21st century, including Karachi and Islamabad.  

Pakistan has a wide variety of ecosystems within its borders, including the Arabian sea, several deserts and major rivers, and more than seven thousand glaciers. Pakistan is also at the confluence of three great mountain ranges; the Hindu Kush, the Himalayas and the Karakoram. Areas such as Sindh province are at increased risk of flooding due to the melting of glaciers and the eruption of glacial lakes, while also being at risk of drought due to an increasingly warm dry season.  Threats such as hurricanes also pose an increasing threat to open populations.  

The PTI-led government, under its political campaign on Green Agenda, have introduced projects like Billion Tree Tsunami and Ten Billion Tree Tsunami to tackle and raise awareness about forestry and afforestation across the country in response.

International Acceptance 
The Billion Tree Tsunami, or the planting of one billion trees, was started by the Khyber Pakhtunkhwa government in 2014. One billion trees were planted on 35,000 hectares of forest and barren land. 

Regional 'Billion Tree Tsunami' project, which started seven years ago in 2014, started a revolution with great silence. The 'Billion Tree Tsunami' soon reverberated not only across the country but also globally, thanks to its performance in environmental organizations such as the Bonn Challenge, the World Bank and IUCN. Foreign diplomats in the diplomatic enclave of Islamabad also turned their attention to it and then the world became aware of their observations and observations. Shortly afterwards, international broadcasters began to take notice, and it was interpreted by a developing country as an important step in the context of climate change. After the successful completion of the Billion Tree Tsunami Project at the provincial level, as soon as the Pakistan Tehreek-e-Insaf (PTI) gets the responsibility to take over the central government in 2018 Due to the personal interest of Prime Minister Imran Khan, he initiated a green environmental revolution by rehabilitating, promoting and large-scale afforestation of one million hectares of forests across the country under the mega project of 10 billion tree tsunami (10 billion tree tsunami). Raised to do. Apparently this is a difficult goal to pursue, but in the last two years, despite all the adversity, the project is moving forward. During this period, not only did the United Nations and the World Economic Forum warmly appreciate Pakistan's commitment, but many other countries, including South Africa, Bangladesh and Saudi Arabia, have launched similar projects in their countries. Announced to start. Two and a half years of the present government have passed and about one billion trees have been planted so far, so the question arises as to whether it is possible to plant 9 billion trees in the next two and a half years. Malik Amin Aslam, Special Adviser to the Prime Minister on Climate Change, answers this question by saying, “Our goal is to plant three billion trees in the next five years, which we will easily achieve. We hope that the next government will be ours and we will achieve this goal with the prayers of these trees. Environmentalist and botanist Rafi-ul-Haq says, “This program has gained so much attention and importance at the national and international levels that even if the next PTI does not come to power, the government will be the one to complete the project There will be global pressure and it will not be possible for any government to end or ignore this project in view of climate change.

The 'Safe Areas' system 

Apart from tree planting, the government of Pakistan have also taken other eco-friendly measures, including increasing the number of protected areas; as of December 2022, there are currently 398 wildlife conservation areas in Pakistan. Of these, 31 have national park status. The total protected land area represents 13% of Pakistan's landmass as of 2020, with the government of Pakistan announcing plans to increase this amount to 15% by 2023.

A National Park Academy has been planned for Ziarat and Balochistan national parks, where young people will be given jobs after special training, with plans to give least 5,000 young people employment.

Other Green Projects

Green energy
The government has immediately abandoned 2600 MW coal burning projects and focused on new 3700 MW hydropower projects instead and such power projects should be given priority in the country now. There are no oil or coal burning in them. "Efforts are being made to generate electricity using solar, water and wind energy. Currently, more than a third of Pakistan's electricity comes from projects where no oil or coal is burned. Efforts are being made to generate two-thirds of the electricity in the same decade without burning oil or coal.

Electric Vehicles

Another eco-friendly project of this government is the promotion of electric vehicles. Smoke from vehicles is a major cause of urban pollution. To address this, the government has announced a new policy to promote the use of electric vehicles. Under this policy, duties and taxes on electric vehicles have been made nominal. Significant progress is being made in this regard. German car company BMW has set up its charging station at Kohsar Market in Islamabad. PSO is also going to build another charging station in Jinnah Supermarket. In Karachi, three charging stations are planned in partnership with Shell and Karachi Electric, which will be installed in Defense, Gulshan and Gadap areas.At present, at least half a dozen companies in the country are installing assembly plants for electric vehicles, which will reduce the cost of these vehicles even more than the current petrol-powered vehicles. The government hopes that by the end of this decade, the share of e-vehicles will reach 30% and 90% by 2030  and 2040 respectively. The first locally produced e-bike was launched along with 6 other models on 8th July, 2021.

Green diplomacy
These trees have opened many closed doors and played the role of green diplomat. "Recently, our relations with Saudi Arabia have been somewhat strained, but when Saudi Arabia launched the Billion Tree project in their country, they wrote a letter to Prime Minister Imran Khan inviting him to visit and restore relations. Done. ' "The United States did not invite us to the climate summit two months ago, but obviously our work could not be ignored, so we had to invite. The word billion tree has become the identity of Pakistan after Saudi Arabia, the UK and New Zealand started working on similar projects.

See also 
 Billion Tree Tsunami, a Khyber Pakhtunkhwa, Pakistan reforestation project
 Trillion Tree Campaign, a UNEP call to plant 1 trillion (1,000,000,000,000 or 10,00,00,00,00,000) trees.

References 

Imran Khan administration
Environmental protection
Environmentalism in Pakistan
Reforestation
Climate change in Pakistan